Ibaneis Rocha Barros Junior (born 10 July 1971) is a Brazilian politician, lawyer and the current Governor of the Federal District. He defeated incumbent governor Rodrigo Rollemberg with 69% of the popular vote. A member of the Brazilian Democratic Movement (MDB), Rocha is the first Federal District native to serve as its governor.

Suspension of duties 
On 8 January 2023, Brazil Supreme Court Justice Alexandre de Moraes temporarily suspended Ibaneis for a period of 90 days from the position of governor after the 2023 invasion of the Brazilian Congress in the federal capital of Brazil for allegations of security flaws. The protests were led by a combination of individuals who support former president Jair Bolsonaro and oppose current president Luiz Inácio Lula da Silva. Vice-Governor Celina Leão temporarily took office until 15 March 2023, when Rocha's suspension was revoked by Moraes.

Notes

References

1971 births
Living people
People from Brasília
Governors of the Federal District (Brazil)
Brazilian Democratic Movement politicians